The 1905 Dartmouth football team was an American football team that represented Dartmouth College as an independent during the 1905 college football season. In its third season under head coach Fred Folsom, the team compiled a 7–1–2 record, shut out six of ten opponents, and outscored opponents by a total of 150 to 34. David Main was the team captain. The team played its home games at Alumni Oval in Hanover, New Hampshire.

Schedule

References

Dartmouth
Dartmouth Big Green football seasons
Dartmouth football